Bełty - is a Polish coat of arms.

History

Blazon

Gallery

See also
 Polish heraldry
 Heraldic family
 List of Polish nobility coats of arms

Bibliography
 Tadeusz Gajl: Herbarz polski od średniowiecza do XX wieku : ponad 4500 herbów szlacheckich 37 tysięcy nazwisk 55 tysięcy rodów. L&L, 2007. .

External links
 Bełty i lista nazwisk w elektronicznej wersji Herbarza polskiego
  Belty Coat of Arms & the bearers. 

Polish coats of arms